Hemimont Plateau is the long and narrow ice-covered plateau of elevation about 1600 m in southern Graham Land, Antarctica bordering Avery Plateau on the north. It is situated midway between Loubet Coast and Fallières Coast on the west, and Bowman Coast on the east, and extends 100 km from the heads of Finsterwalder Glacier and Demorest Glacier on the north to Neny Glacier on the south. Its higher southern part rises to 1862 m and features McLeod Hill (1741 m), Beacon Hill (1770 m) and Armadillo Hill (1775 m).

The plateau is named after the Roman province of Hemimont in Southeastern Bulgaria.

Location
British mapping in 1974.

Maps
Antarctic Digital Database (ADD). Scale 1:250000 topographic map of Antarctica. Scientific Committee on Antarctic Research (SCAR). Since 1993, regularly upgraded and updated.
British Antarctic Territory: Graham Land. Scale 1:250000 topographic map. BAS 250 Series, Sheet SQ 19–20. London, 1974.

Central plateaus of Graham Land
North to south:
 Laclavère Plateau
 Louis Philippe Plateau
 Detroit Plateau
 Herbert Plateau
 Foster Plateau
 Forbidden Plateau
 Bruce Plateau
 Avery Plateau
 Hemimont Plateau

Notes

References
 Bulgarian Antarctic Gazetteer. Antarctic Place-names Commission. (details in Bulgarian, basic data in English)
 Hemimont Plateau. SCAR Composite Antarctic Gazetteer

External links
 Hemimont Plateau. Adjusted Copernix satellite image

Plateaus of Antarctica
Landforms of Graham Land
Bulgaria and the Antarctic
Loubet Coast
Fallières Coast
Bowman Coast